This is list of editions of Leza Awards, an Ethiopian music and film award held in Hilton Hotel in Addis Ababa since 2010.

2015
The fifth edition of Leza Awards was scheduled on 1 October 2015 at Hilton Hotel in Addis Ababa. Organized by Birhanu Digaffe, a radio host and producer, the final list of nominees drawn from the field of music and film was released to the public.

Best Music Album 
 Siwedlat - Madingo Afework
 Astaraki - Abinet Agonafir
 Meche New - Yosef Gebre
 Zebenay - Dan Admasu
 Yeneta - Tsehaye Yohanis
 Manew Fitsum - Betty G

Best Music Single 
 "Seba Dereja" - Teddy Afro
 "Sidet" - Yegna
 "Seifhen Ansa" - Zeritu Kebede
 "Alsemam" - Jacky Gossy
 "Mal Naweya" - Abinet Agonafir
 "Hagere" – Mahmoud Ahmed
 "Yefikir Girma" – Tsedenia Gebremarkos

Best Music Video 
 "Shik Biles" by Yosef Gebre
 "Astaraki" by Abinet Agonafir
 "Manew Yalew" by Abinet Agonafir
 "Tangut" by Madingo Afework
 "Nana Demaye" by Betty G
 "Keza Sefer" by Tamrat Desta

Best New Album 

Zebenay by Dan Admasu
Ewnet by Hana Girma
Manew Fisum by Betty G
Selamta by Ras Janny

Best Film Score 

 Tsedenya Gebremarkos in Hareyet
 Anteneh Minalu in Lamba
 Matias Yilma in Yaye Yifredew
 Kasahun Eshetu in Shefu 2
 Elias Husein in Fikirena Genzeb
 Hailu Amerga in Zetegn Mot

Lifetime Achievement 

 Maritu legesse
 Alemayehu Eshete
 Bahta Gebrehiwot
 Dawit Yifru
 Girma Beyene
 Girma Negash
 Yohannis Afework

2019
The 9th edition of Sheger FM Radio Leza Radio Show was held on 19 October 2019 at Hilton Hotel. Singer Chelina, who debuted her album in December 2018, took two of the 12 categories of the 9th Leza Listeners' Award - Album of the Year and Best Artist of the Year. In addition, the most acclaimed feature film named Quragnaye won three categories – Best Feature Film and Best Actress and Best Actor.

Single of the Year ― Presented by Teshome Sisay (Singer/Composer) 

 "Belba" by Jambo Jote — WINNER

 "Ete Abay" by Abrham Belayneh "Sey" by Ephrem Amare

 "Tilobign" by Rahel Getu

 "Adimera" Yared Negu

 "Mahiya" Dany Magna

Best Actor in Television Series 
Presented by Kurabachew Deneke (Playwright)

 Abebe Balcha (TV Series: Zemen on EBS) — WINNER
 Alemayehu Tadesse (Derso Mels on FANA)
 Yigerem Dejene (Mogachoch on EBS)
 Million Berhane (Zetenegnaw Shi on FANA)
 Solomon Bogale (Zemen on EBS)
 Michael Tamire (Min Litazez on FANA)

Best New Artist  
Presented by Presented by Kuku Sebsebe (Singer)

 Chelina — WINNER
 Ziggy Zaga (Behailu Tafesse)
Jacky Gosee
 Yohana
 Hayleyesus Feyssa (Haile)
 Dag Daniel

Best Actor 
Presented by Azeb Worku (Playwright)

 Zerihun Mulat (film: Quragnaye) — WINNER
 Henok Wondimu (Sumalew Vandam)
 Tariku Birhanu "Baba" (Mugnu Yarada Lij 4)
 Alemseged Assefa (Atifred)
 Cherinet Fikadu (Zemene)
 Girum Ermiays (Tefetari)

Song of the Year 
Presented by Samuel Yirga (Musician and composer)

 Serkaleme by Ziggy Zaga (Behailu Tafesse) — WINNER
 Bati by Chelina
 Maye Kaja by Yohana
 Gum Semay by Ziggy Zaga (Behailu Tafesse)
 Habesha by Dag Daniel
 Selam Yisten by Gossaye Tesfaye

Best Actress  
Presented by Aboneh Ashagre (Playwright/ Associate Professor)

 Yemisrach Girma (film: Quragnaye) — WINNER
 Meskerem Abera (Simet)
 Edelework Tassew (Wedefit)
 Melat Yirgalem (Berabish)
 Shewit Kebede (Wuha ena Werk)
 Kalkidan Tibebu (Zemene)

Best TV Series  
Presented by Manyazewal Endeshaw (Theater/Film Director)

 Derso Mels on FANA (Directed by Meaza Worku; Kiba Multimedia Production/ Amad Film Production)  — WINNER
 Mogachoch on EBS
 Zetenegnaw Shi on Fana
 Betoch on ETV
 Min Litazez on FANA
 Zemen on EBS
 Best Album of the Year   
 Hailu Mergia (Accordionist, keyboardist)

 Chelina by Chelina — WINNER
Nigus by Jah Lude
 Siyamish Yamegna by Gossaye Tesfaye
 Yohana by Yohana
 Korma by Ziggy Zaga (Behailu Tafesse)
 Balambaras by Jacky Gosee
 Best Feature Film  

Presented by Abraham Gezahegn (Screen writer, director, producer)

 Quragnaye (Directed by Moges Tafesse; Starring Zerihun Mulatu, Tesfaye Demam, Yemisrach Girma, Frehiwot Kelkilew, Feleke Kassa and Henok Zerabiruk)
 Tefetari Wedefit Zemene Mognu Yarada Lij 4 Simet Best Actress in Television Series  
Presented by Hanna Terefe (Stage and screen actress)

 Hanna Yohannes (TV Series: Zemen on EBS) — WINNER
 Meskerem Abera (Min Litazez on FANA )
 Mekdes Tsegaye (Mogachoch on EBS)
 Christy Haile (Derso Mels on FANA)
 Mestawet Aragaw (Senselet on EBS)
 Martha Getachew (Derso Mels on FANA)
 Best Music Video (Clip) 
Presented by Hamelmal Abate (Singer)

 "Ke Ehud Eske Ehud" – Gossaye Tesfaye — WINNER
 "Benetselay"– Dawit Nega
 "Mircha Alat" – Yohana
 "Say Bay" – Chelina
 "Yebalewa Konjo" – Dag Daniel
Kedamawit – Jacky Gosee
 Lifetime Achievement Award Recipient 
Presented by Elias Tebabal (Singer)
2022
The 12th edition of Leza Awards was held on 25 May 2022.

Best  Single Music: Rophnan – SOSTBest Video Clip: Tilahun Gessesse – "Qome Limereqesh"

Best New Singer: Elias Melka and Dawit Tsige

Best Song of the Year:  Meselu Fantahun – "Limeta Woyes Mita"

Best Drama Series: EregnayeBest Drama Series Actor: Million Berhane (Zetenegnaw Shi)

Best Drama Series Actress Direbworq Seyfu (Eregnaye)

Best Actress: Meskerem Abere (Ensaro)

Best Actor: Amanuel Habtamu (Ensaro)

Best Film:  EnsaroBest Album: Dawit Tsige (Yene Zema'')Lifetime Award''': Selam Seyoum

References

Lists of awards